The Women's Beach Volleyball tournament at the 2019 Military World Games was held in Wuhan, China from 21 to 26 October.

Preliminary round

Group A

Group B

Group C

Final Round

Bracket

Quarter-finals

Semi-finals

Bronze medal match

Gold medal match

Final standing

External links
Beach Volleyball tournament of the 7th Military World Games - Official website of the 2019 Military World Games
Results book

Beach Volleyball Women
2019 women